Mercy Catherine Adjabeng is a Ghanaian author, editor-in-chief and Managing Editor of the Discovery Teen Magazine. She is also the Communications and Media Advisor of Women in Law and Development in Africa (WiLDAF).

Education 
Mercy studied at the University of Cape Coast for her Bachelor of Education degree in Psychology with English from 1994 to 1998. She is an experienced, enthusiastic, dynamic and results oriented communications specialist, gender advocate, writer & public speaker with a demonstrated record of working in the government, NGO & Education industry and Diplomatic community. She has skills in advocacy, strategic planning, and media management.

She also earned qualifications from the following institutions:

Career 
She is a former English Language and Literature teacher at Wesley Girls' High School in Cape Coast. She interviewed the US Ambassador to Ghana, Robert Potter Jackson. She partnered with French Embassy in Ghana, GOLDKEY Properties and UNFPA Ghana to launch the Discovery Teen Magazine and the Discovery Teen Chat forum. She has also partnered with Stanbic Bank Ghana, I-ZAR Group, Effe Farms and Trading Enterprise among others. She currently works at 3FM. She is also the Research and Public Affairs Officer of the Australian High Commission in Ghana.

Philanthropy 
Mrs. Mercy has a heart which seeks to address issues confronting teenagers like challenges they face at their teen stage. She donated her book called 'Understanding English Literature' to Wesley Girls' High School. The books donated were claimed to worth GH¢6,000.

She also donated her books to St. Thomas Aquinas and Forces Secondary Technical School in Accra.

References 

Living people
Ghanaian publishers (people)
Ghanaian radio presenters
Ghanaian women radio presenters
Ghanaian television presenters
Ghanaian women television presenters
Ghanaian journalists
Ghanaian women journalists
Year of birth missing (living people)